Ed Stafford: Into The Unknown is a 2015 documentary television series commissioned by Discovery Channel and produced by Keo Films.

Ed Stafford is on a mission to investigate some of the planet's mysteries. Using photographs of Earth, taken by satellites, showing strange markings in some of the most remote places on the planet, he sets out to find the targets, and solve the riddles.

Episodes

References

External links

 

Discovery Channel original programming
Television shows filmed in Indonesia
Television shows filmed in Russia
Television shows filmed in Ethiopia
Television shows filmed in Brazil
Television shows filmed in Zambia